François Guérin (1927–2003) was a French film and television actor.

Filmography

References

External links
 

1927 births
2003 deaths
French male film actors
French male television actors
Male actors from Paris